Mohamed Ould Cheikh Mohamed Ahmed Ould Ghazouani (born 4 December 1956), also known as Ghazouani and Ould Ghazouani, is a Mauritanian politician and retired Mauritanian Army general who is the 9th President of Mauritania, having assumed office on 1 August 2019.

He is a former General Director of National Security and former Chief of Staff of the Armed Forces of Mauritania (2008–2018). He was Defence Minister for Mauritania from October 2018 to March 2019. A close ally of his predecessor Mohamed Ould Abdel Aziz, Ghazouani was elected as President of Mauritania on 22 June 2019 following the presidential election. Mohamed Ould Ghazouani's victory in the 2019 Mauritanian presidential election was presented as having been the country's first peaceful transition of power since independence.

Personal life
Ghazouani was born in Boumdeid, Assaba region on 4 December 1956. He belongs to a well-known Sufi Berber family in Mauritania. Ghazouani is the son of a spiritual leader of the Maraboutic tribe Ideiboussat. Ghazouani has memorised the Quran. He is married to a doctor, Mariam Mint Mohamed Vadel Ould Dah. They have five children, from whom Mohamed Lemine Ould Cheikh El-Ghazouani is the eldest son.

Career

Military career
He joined the Mauritanian Army in the late 1970s. He continued his training as an officer in Morocco. He received a baccalaureate degree, a master's degree in Administration and Military Sciences, and completed several war training certificates and courses.

Ghazouani was aide-de-camp to President Maaouya Ould Sid'Ahmed Taya from 1987 to 1991.

Ghazouani was an ally of former President Mohamed Ould Abdel Aziz, and was his partner in the overthrow of President Sidi Ould Cheikh Abdallahi in 2008, and was a member of the military junta that ousted former President Maaouya Ould Sid'Ahmed Taya In 2005.

Political career
In October 2018, President Mohamed Ould Abdel Aziz named him as defence minister of Mauritania.

On 1 March 2019, Ghazouani announced his candidacy for the presidency, seeking to replace President Mohamed Ould Abdel Aziz. On 15 March he resigned as defence minister to pursue his presidential ambition.

On 22 June 2019, he became Mauritania's elected president after a presidential election against five candidates in a race to the "gray palace".

On 1 August 2019, he was sworn in as the 9th President of Mauritania.

References

External links

1956 births
Living people
People from Assaba Region
Presidents of Mauritania
Defence ministers of Mauritania
Mauritanian military personnel
Mauritanian Muslims
Mauritanian Sufis
Union for the Republic (Mauritania) politicians
20th-century Mauritian people
21st-century Mauritanian politicians